New London High School is a high school in New London, Connecticut operated by the New London Public Schools school district.

U.S. News & World Report rankings
In 2014, the school received a bronze medal ranking from the U.S. News & World Report magazine.

Contraceptive clinic
In March 2012, a clinic at the school operated by Child & Family Agency of Southeastern Connecticut began to provide condoms and birth control prescriptions to students.

Notable alumni

Rajai Davis (1999), Major League Baseball player (2006- )
Kris Dunn (2012), National Basketball Association player (2016-)
John Ellis, Major League Baseball player (1969–81)
Jose B. Gonzalez, poet and educator 
Peter Rindskopf (1960), civil rights lawyer
Jordan Reed (2008), National Football League player (2013- )
David Reed (2005), former NFL player
Tim Riordan (1978), United States Football League and NFL player (1984–87)
Dawn Robinson, singer; founding member of R&B vocal group En Vogue
Tyson Wheeler (1994), NBA player (1999), NCAA men's basketball coach (2010- )

Bartlett School
Robert Bartlett, a New London resident who died in 1678, willed that all his property be used to benefit public education. The Bartlett Grammar School was named in his honor, and renamed in 1855 to Bartlett High School. The high school was used until 1873 when it was replaced by the Bulkeley School which operated from 1873 to 1951.  In 1896, the Robert E. Bartlett Grammar School, located at 216 Broad Street was established and named after the founder of the "old Bartlett High School". The building was repurposed in 1951 when other district schools were merged to form the New London High School. The building is presently under private ownership and used as an office building.

References

Public high schools in Connecticut
New London, Connecticut